The ARIA Singles Chart ranks the best-performing singles in Australia. Its data, published by the Australian Recording Industry Association, is based collectively on each single's weekly physical and digital sales. In 2008, fifteen singles claimed the top spot, including Timbaland's "Apologize", which started its peak position in late 2007. Twelve acts achieved their first number-one single in Australia, either as a lead or featured artist: Leona Lewis, Flo Rida, T-Pain, Colbie Caillat, Gabriella Cilmi, Jordin Sparks, Katy Perry, Kid Rock, Lady Gaga, Colby O'Donis, Kings of Leon and Wes Carr. Five collaborations topped the chart. Lady Gaga earned two number-one singles during the year for "Just Dance" and "Poker Face".

"Poker Face" was the longest running number-one single, having topped the ARIA Singles Chart for six weeks in 2008 and two additional weeks in 2009. Perry's "I Kissed a Girl" topped the chart for six consecutive weeks, while Lewis' "Bleeding Love" and Cilmi's "Sweet About Me" both stayed at number one for five weeks. Rihanna's "Don't Stop the Music", Sparks' "No Air", Pink's "So What", and Kings of Leon's "Sex on Fire" each spent four weeks at the number-one spot.

Chart history

Number-one artists

See also
2008 in music
List of number-one albums of 2008 (Australia)
List of top 25 singles for 2008 in Australia
List of top 10 singles in 2008 (Australia)

References

Number-one singles
Australia Singles
2008